Sumaiya Siddiqi (born 30 November 1988) is a Pakistani former cricketer who played as a right-arm medium bowler. She appeared in 19 One Day Internationals and 15 Twenty20 Internationals for Pakistan between 2007 and 2015. She played domestic cricket for Hyderabad, Sindh, Higher Education Commission, Saif Sports Saga, Omar Associates and State Bank of Pakistan.

Career

One Day International
Sumaiya Siddiqi made her One Day International debut against South Africa on 26 January 2007.

T20I
Sumaiya Siddiqi made her Twenty20 International debut against England on 27 September 2012.

References

External links
 
 

1988 births
Living people
Pakistani women cricketers
Pakistan women One Day International cricketers
Pakistan women Twenty20 International cricketers
Cricketers from Karachi
Hyderabad (Pakistan) women cricketers
Sindh women cricketers
Higher Education Commission women cricketers
Saif Sports Saga women cricketers
Omar Associates women cricketers
State Bank of Pakistan women cricketers
Asian Games medalists in cricket
Cricketers at the 2014 Asian Games
Asian Games gold medalists for Pakistan
Medalists at the 2014 Asian Games